Nakkampadi is a village in the Sendurai taluk of Ariyalur district, Tamil Nadu, India.

Demographics 

As per the 2001 census, Nakkampadi had a total population of 2679 with 1332 males and 1347 females.

References 

Villages in Ariyalur district